Don Budge successfully defended his title, defeating Bunny Austin in the final, 6–1, 6–0, 6–3 to win the gentlemen's singles tennis title at the 1938 Wimbledon Championships. This marked the last appearance in a men's singles final by a British player until Andy Murray's appearance in the 2012 final.

Seeds

  Don Budge (champion)
  Bunny Austin (final)
  Roderich Menzel (fourth round)
  Henner Henkel (semifinals)
  Franjo Punčec (semifinals)
  Dragutin Mitić (fourth round)
  Ladislav Hecht (quarterfinals)
  Kho Sin-Kie (fourth round)

Draw

Finals

Top half

Section 1

Section 2

Section 3

Section 4

Bottom half

Section 5

Section 6

Section 7

Section 8

References

External links
 

Men's Singles
Wimbledon Championship by year – Men's singles